F-box only protein 5 is a protein that in humans is encoded by the FBXO5 gene.

Function 

This gene encodes a member of the F-box protein family which is characterized by an approximately 40 amino acid motif, the F-box. The F-box proteins constitute one of the four subunits of the ubiquitin protein ligase complex called SCFs (SKP1-cullin-F-box), which function in phosphorylation-dependent ubiquitination. The F-box proteins are divided into 3 classes: Fbws containing WD-40 domains, Fbls containing leucine-rich repeats, and Fbxs containing either different protein-protein interaction modules or no recognizable motifs. The protein encoded by this gene belongs to the Fbxs class. This protein is similar to xenopus early mitotic inhibitor-1 (Emi1), which is a mitotic regulator that interacts with Cdc20 and inhibits the anaphase promoting complex.  Moreover, Emi1 also assembles a CRL1 complex that targets RAD51 for ubiquitin-mediated degradation.

Disease 

Gene and protein expression of FBXO5/Emi1 are increased in many human cancers and increased expression has been shown to cause chromosome instability and cancer.

Interactions 

FBXO5 has been shown to interact with:
 CDC20,
 FZR1,  
 SKP1A. and
RAD51.

References

Further reading